Sangat Television is TV channel, and is a Project of, and wholly owned by Sangat Trust, a Registered UK charity. The station commenced broadcasting on 1 September 2010, as part of a two-week test phase.

Description
Sangat TV is owned by Sangat Trust, a UK Registered Charity backed by gurdwaras from the UK and from other individuals. The channel is an open platform for the Sikhs sangat to express their views independently. Programming includes educational material on the Sikh gurus and Guru Granth Sahib. The channel is now broadcast on Sky channel 769.

West Midlands riots
Sangat TV came into prominence during the West Midlands riots of August 2011. The presenter Upinder Randhawa notably broadcast live from the streets of Birmingham from the first day of rioting in the area, Monday 8 August 2011, to provide accurate, live information and broadcasts. Coverage was extended to the surrounding areas such as West Bromwich and Wolverhampton the following night. The channel's coverage was used by BBC News, ITN and Sky News as well as international stations such as CNN, Fox News and NDTV 24x7 to show what was happening in the area.

This coverage included sequences of guerrilla journalism, most notably footage of the reporting team transporting a police officer in their vehicle in pursuit of looters while live on air. The popularity of the coverage led to Sangat TV presenter Upinder Randhawa's Twitter following jumping from 600 users to about 4,000 users in one night, as well as having over 4,000 followers to a fan page on Facebook called "Upinder Randhawa from Sangat TV is a Legend". Prime Minister David Cameron hailed Sangat TV's contribution as "an example of a media company's commitment to social responsibility". On 10 August 2011, Ofcom said it had received one complaint about the previous night's coverage of the riots, in relation to alleged incitement to violence over comments urging people to get out on the streets and protect their property.

Management issues 

In August 2016, word went round that Sangat TV would be moving its base from Edgbaston, Birmingham to Southall, London in a bid to get better content and volunteers to run the channel.

Ofcom / broadcasting issues
Sangat TV was fined £30,000 over a debate in which guests supported an assassination attempt on a former Indian Army general, Kuldip Singh Brar, who led the army attack on Akal Takht in Operation Blue Star in June 1984.

In 2015, the Ofcom Broadcasting Code was broken when Sangat TV continuously aired a song hailing 'Sukha Jinda', two criminals who had robbed a bank, with justification that it was an advert from Dharam Seva Records. The complainant considered that the video glorified the actions of two Sikh nationalists Harjinder Singh Jinda and Sukhdev Singh Sukha ("Jinda" and "Sukha" respectively). These men, who were members of the Khalistan Commando Force, were hanged in 1992 for the assassination of General Arun Shridhar Vadiya, the Chief of the Indian Army responsible for Operation Bluestar in 1984. They were also found responsible for the murder of two Indian politicians.

Ofcom upheld a complaint made by Dr Parvinder Singh Garcha. The programme, which aired in September 2014 included a live debate in advance of an election for a new committee to run the Gurdwara Sri Guru Singh Sabha in Southall, West London. At the end of the debate two videos were shown. The second video also included the claim that money had been stolen from a donation box in the Gurdwara during a period when the Baaj Group was in control. Ofcom noted that the decision to include the second video was made by the presenter during the course of the programme and that Dr Garcha said that he had left the studio before at the end of the debate (i.e. before the video in question was shown). However, in Ofcom's view, it is reasonable to expect that before making such a decision, a broadcaster would be familiar with the content of any material it planned to broadcast. Ofcom considered that the Baaj Group was treated unfairly in this respect in the programme as broadcast.

References

 https://www.facebook.com/DalKhalsaUK/posts/10154257993311721
 https://www.sikh24.com/2016/01/26/uk-sikh-channel-sangat-tv-falls-foul-of-ofcom/#.WQXHVty1uUk
 https://www.bizasialive.com/ofcom-upholds-complaint-of-guest-on-sangat-tv/
 https://www.ofcom.org.uk/__data/assets/pdf_file/0024/61386/regis1limited.pdf

External links
 Official website
 Sangat Trust website

Broadcasting in Birmingham, West Midlands
Religious television channels in the United Kingdom
Sikh mass media
Television channels and stations established in 2010
Sikhism in the United Kingdom